Frederick William Green (March 21, 1869 – 1949) was an English Egyptologist, who worked at a number of sites throughout Egypt.

Biography
He was born in London on 21 March 1869. He worked at Hierakonpolis (ancient Nekhen), where amongst other discoveries his team found the Narmer Palette in 1898.

He studied at Jesus College in Cambridge, continuing to study Archaeology and Egyptology under  Kurt Sethe in Göttingen and Strasbourg and then excavated sites in and around Egypt with Flinders Petrie and Somers Clarke. He worked with James Quibell at Hierakonpolis from 1897 to 1898 (and alone in 1899).

He later excavated at Eileithyiaspolis with Clarke and Archibald Sayce from 1901 to 1902. He surveyed the topography and monuments of Nubia in 1906 and 1909 to 1910. Nearing the end of his career Green led the Mond excavation of the Bucheum at Armant from 1929 to 1930. He was the Honorary Keeper of the Antiquities at the Fitzwilliam Museum in Cambridge, from 1908 to 1949.

He was an accomplished watercolourist, he produced hundreds of paintings during his travels. In 2009 a collection of 149 paintings, together with childhood drawings and early sketchbooks have surfaced for sale on an online auction site, fully documented before their dispersal.

He died in Great Shelford, Cambridgeshire in 1949.

References

The Waters of the Nile at www.rps.psu.edu

1869 births
1949 deaths
English Egyptologists
Archaeologists from London
Alumni of Jesus College, Cambridge
People from Great Shelford